The 1985–86 Roller Hockey Champions Cup was the 20th edition of the Roller Hockey Champions Cup organized by CERH.

Barcelona achieved their tenth title ever.

Teams
The champions of the main European leagues played this competition, consisting in a double-legged knockout tournament. As Spanish champions Barcelona qualified as title holder, Tordera was also admitted as the Spanish representative.

Bracket

Source:

References

External links
 CERH website

1984 in roller hockey
1985 in roller hockey
Rink Hockey Euroleague